The Fountain to Bartolomé de las Casas (Spanish: Fuente de Fray Bartolomé de las Casas) is installed since 1924 outside the Mexico City Metropolitan Cathedral, in Mexico. The statue of de las Casas was designed by José Fernández Urbina.

References

Fountains in Mexico
Historic center of Mexico City
Sculptures of men in Mexico
Statues in Mexico City
Outdoor sculptures in Mexico City